Charm may refer to:

Social science
 Charisma, a person or thing's pronounced ability to attract others
 Superficial charm, flattery, telling people what they want to hear

Science and technology
 Charm quark, a type of elementary particle
 Charm (quantum number), the difference between the number of charm quarks and charm antiquarks in a particle
 Neoregelia 'Charm', a hybrid cultivar flowering plant

Computing
 Charm (programming language), devised in the 1990s, similar to RTL/2, Pascal and C
 Charm++, a parallel programming language based on C++
 Charms, part of the Windows shell user interface in Microsoft Windows 8 and 8.1

Magic and superstition
 Magic charm or incantation
 Charm, an object believed to have been magically charmed, such as an amulet
 Trinket, on a charm bracelet

Business
 BlackBerry Charm, a mobile phone
 Motorola Charm, a smartphone
 Charm (finance), in quantitative finance, a second order derivative of an option pricing function versus the underlying spot price and time
 The Charm Company, manufacturer of Charms Blow Pops candy; acquired by Tootsie Roll Industries
 Charms, a brand of cigarette manufactured by VST Industries

Arts and entertainment

Literature
 The Charm, play by Walter Besant 1896
 The Charm, poetry collection by Robert Creeley 1969
 The Charm, poetry collection by Kathy Fagan
 The Charm (play), a play by Christopher R. Shimmin

Music

Bands
 The Charms, an American garage rock band
 Otis Williams and the Charms, an American doo-wop group

Albums
 The Charm, by American rapper Bubba Sparxxx
 The Charm (T. S. Monk album), 1995
 Charm (album), by American producer and rapper Danny!

Songs
 "Charm", a song by Wild Colonials from the album This Can't Be Life
 "Charm", a song by Tony Banks from the album The Fugitive 1983 
 "Charm", a song by Positive Noise	1981
 "Charm", a song by Virginia Astley 1987
 "Charms" (Bobby Vee song), 1963
 "Charms" (The Philosopher Kings song), 1996

People
 Daniel Charms, a pseudonym of Russian poet, writer and dramatist Daniil Kharms (1905–1942)
 Charm Tong (born 1981), teacher and human rights activist from Shan State, Burma

Other uses
 Charm, Ohio, an unincorporated community in the US
 Baltimore Charm, a franchise in the Legends Football League (formerly the Lingerie Football League)
 Royal Ordnance L30, Challenger armament (CHARM) project to provide a new main armament for the British Challenger 2 tank

See also

Charl (name)
 Charmstone, a stone or mineral artifact of various types associated with various traditional cultures
 CHARMM (Chemistry at Harvard Macromolecular Mechanics), a widely used set of force fields for molecular dynamics
 Charmed (disambiguation)
 Charmer (disambiguation)
 Charming (disambiguation)
Charo (disambiguation)
 Lucky charm (disambiguation)